The White Hills are a mountain range in the Mojave Desert, east of U.S. Route 395 in southern Inyo County, California.

The White Hills are in the general region of the Coso Range, east of the Scodie Mountains and Sierra Nevadas, and south of the Owens Lake basin.

References 

Mountain ranges of the Mojave Desert
Mountain ranges of Inyo County, California
Hills of California
Mountain ranges of Southern California